Mỹ Trạch is a rural commune (xã) and village in Bố Trạch District, Quảng Bình Province, in Vietnam.

Populated places in Quảng Bình province
Communes of Quảng Bình province